"One Love" is a song by British electronic music act the Prodigy, released on 4 October 1993 as the first single from their second album, Music for the Jilted Generation (1994). The song peaked at number eight on the UK Singles Chart and number five on the UK Dance Singles Chart. It was also a top 30 hit in Sweden and Switzerland.

Inspiration
Liam Howlett first released the songs "One Love" and "One Love" (Jonny L Remix) as two 12-inch white labels, called "Earthbound 1" and "Earthbound 2".

The version that appeared on the Prodigy's second studio album Music for the Jilted Generation was the shorter edit version due to the band having to trim some running time off the album to allow it to fit on the master CD.

Critical reception
Andy Beevers from Music Week gave the song four out of five, calling it a "charging percussion-laden and bass-heavy" track. James Hamilton from the RM Dance Update described the original mix as "hardcore star's muezzin punctuated surging frantic 148bpm".

Music video
The accompanying music video for the song was created by Hyperbolic Systems and featured computer generated graphics with occasional images of the band members dancing among tribal figures.

Soundtrack
In 1995, "One Love" (along with Voodoo People) was included in the soundtrack for the movie Hackers, starring Jonny Lee Miller and Angelina Jolie.

Track listings
All songs were written by Liam Howlett.

 12-inch vinyl
 "One Love" (original mix) (5:50)
 "Rhythm of Life" (original mix) (5:05)
 "Full Throttle" (original mix) (5:28)
 "One Love" (Jonny L remix) (5:10)

 CD single
 "One Love" (edit) (3:53)
 "Rhythm of Life" (original mix) (5:05)
 "Full Throttle" (original mix) (5:28)
 "One Love" (Jonny L remix) (5:10)

Note: "One Love" (edit) is named "One Love" (Juliana mix) on the Japanese release

Charts

References

External links
 Further information about the single

The Prodigy songs
1993 singles
XL Recordings singles
Songs written by Liam Howlett
1993 songs